The Bursting Pulsar (GRO J1744-28) is a low-mass x-ray binary with a period of 11.8 days. It was discovered in December 1995 by the Burst and Transient Source Experiment on the Compton Gamma-Ray Observatory, the second of the NASA Great Observatories. The pulsar is unique in that it has a "bursting phase" where it emits gamma rays and X-rays peaking at approximately 20 bursts per hour after which the frequency of bursts drops off and the pulsar enters a quiescent phase. After a few months, the bursts reappear, though not yet with predictable regularity.

The Bursting Pulsar is the only known X-ray pulsar that is also a Type II X-ray burster.

References

Pulsars
X-ray binaries
Sagittarius (constellation)
199512??